Lyons Cone is a cone shaped peak  north-northeast of the Matterhorn, rising to  on the ridge separating the heads of Lacroix Glacier, Newall Glacier, and Suess Glacier in the Asgard Range, Victoria Land, Antarctica.

It was named by the Advisory Committee on Antarctic Names after American geochemist William Berry Lyons, a veteran of expeditions to the Himalayas, Greenland, Iceland, and Antarctica, 1980–97, and chief scientist of the McMurdo Dry Valleys Long-Term Ecological Research field team, 1993–97.

References

Mountains of the Asgard Range
McMurdo Dry Valleys